Tyneham is a ghost village abandoned in 1943 and former civil parish, now in the civil parish of Steeple with Tyneham, in south Dorset, England, near Lulworth on the Isle of Purbeck. The civil parish was abolished on 1 April 2014 and merged with Steeple to form Steeple with Tyneham.

Location

The village lies in a secluded east-west valley between two ridges of the Purbeck Hills. To the north is the main ridge with Povington Hill and its highest point, Ridgeway Hill. To the south is the ridge above Gad Cliff that runs from the headland of Worbarrow Tout in the west to the knoll of Tyneham Cap in the east.

Access
Tyneham is only accessible when the Lulworth Ranges are open to the public. The military firing ranges are owned by the Ministry of Defence (MoD) and are part of the Armoured Fighting Vehicles Gunnery School. Safety warnings about explosives and unexploded shells are posted at Mupe Bay by the MoD: visitors are advised to keep to official footpaths and observe local site notices because tanks and armoured vehicles are used in this area.

History
The parish includes evidence of occupation dating back to Iron Age Britain; there are more than 30 barrows in the area, although most have been damaged by shelling. Proof of Roman occupation has also been found in the valley around Tyneham and there were salt-boiling, shale-turning and Purbeck Marble industries at Worbarrow Bay. South of the chalk ridge are remains of a medieval settlement and strip fields.

It seems that it was once the possession of Robert, Count of Mortain, the half-brother of William I of England. The village is mentioned in the Domesday Book as Tigeham, meaning "goat enclosure". A century later, the village was known as Tiham and only in later times as Tyneham. The limestone church of St Mary dates from at least the 15th century.

In 1683 Nathaniel Bond (1634–1707) of Lutton acquired Tyneham from the Williams family. He also bought Creech Grange in 1691 and the family still hold their Purbeck estates. Tyneham school was established by the Reverend Nathaniel Bond (1804–89) in 1860. It was later declared as property of the rectory and was closed in 1932 due to lack of pupils.

This measure was supposed to be temporary for the duration of World War II, but in 1948 the Army placed a compulsory purchase order on the land and it has remained in use for military training ever since. Although littered with scrap used as targets and subject to regular shelling, the land has become a haven for wildlife as it has been free from farming and development. In 1975, after complaints from tourists and locals, the Ministry of Defence began opening the village and footpaths across the ranges at weekends and throughout August. 

Many of the village buildings have fallen into disrepair or have been damaged by shelling. In 1967, most of the manor house, with parts that dated back to the 14th century, was pulled down by the then Ministry of Works. The building's east front was reconstructed at Athelhampton, with smaller parts moved to Melcombe Horsey and Bingham's Melcombe. The church of St Mary, however, remains largely intact; it has a stained-glass window by Martin Travers and memorials to the Bond family, but the 17th century pulpit was moved to Lulworth Camp and the plate to Kimmeridge. The church and school house have since been preserved as museums. The church, school and drinking fountain are all grade II listed buildings. In 2008, Tyneham Farm was reopened to the public and conservation work there is ongoing.

Film and literature
In 1985 the village was used for the filming of Comrades, which depicts the story of the Tolpuddle Martyrs. The church had a fibreglass tower and large additional gravestones and Post Office Row was fronted with fibreglass cottages. During the filming Tyneham's original 1929 K1 Mark 236 telephone kiosk was destroyed and the film company sourced a replacement.

The village is the setting for the climax to the comic-thriller Angel's Share by Mike Ripley (2006).

Tyneham is featured in episode 5 of the first season of Life After People, "The Invaders", in which its existence as a settlement suddenly abandoned by its residents is examined.

The village is the setting for the novel The Forgotten Village by Lorna Cook (2019).

Gallery

See also
Imber, in Wiltshire on the Salisbury Plain, is another village which was taken over for military purposes.
The Stanford Battle Area, in Norfolk, contains six villages also taken over for military purposes.
Povington Priory
List of lost settlements in the United Kingdom

References

External links

Tyneham: Opening Dates and Times
Tyneham & Worbarrow
Tyneham Village
Tyneham House
Fortean Times: Village of the Vanished
Google Earth view

Former civil parishes in Dorset
Former populated places in Dorset
Ghost towns in England
History of Dorset
Isle of Purbeck
Jurassic Coast
Villages in Dorset
Forcibly depopulated communities in the United Kingdom during World War II
Populated places disestablished in 2014
Forcibly depopulated communities in the United Kingdom